Aisam Ibrahim (born 7 May 1997) is a Maldivian professional footballer who plays as a midfielder for Maziya.

Career
Aisam started his career at Club Eagles, before joining T.C. Sports Club in 2019.

On 5 January 2020, Aisam joined Maziya on a three and a half year deal.

International
Aisam was first called up for the senior Maldives national football team in 2019 for the 2019 Indian Ocean Island Games.

He made his official debut in the 2022 FIFA World Cup qualification first group stage match against Guam.

International goals

References

External links
 
 

1997 births
Living people
Maldivian footballers
Association football midfielders
Maldives international footballers
Maziya S&RC players
T.C. Sports Club players
Club Eagles players